Lake Tabina is a lake in Võru County, Estonia.

See also
List of lakes of Estonia

Tabina
Võru Parish
Tabina